Agonal respiration, gasping respiration or agonal breathing is a distinct abnormal pattern of breathing and brainstem reflex characterized by gasping, labored breathing, accompanied by strange vocalizations and myoclonus. Possible causes include cerebral ischemia, extreme hypoxia (inadequate oxygen supply to tissue), or even anoxia (total depletion of oxygen).  Agonal breathing is an extremely serious medical sign requiring immediate medical attention, as the condition generally progresses to complete apnea and heralds death. The duration of agonal respiration can be as brief as two breaths or last up to several hours.

The term is sometimes (inaccurately) used to refer to labored, gasping breathing patterns accompanying organ failure (e.g. liver failure and  kidney failure), SIRS, septic shock, and metabolic acidosis (see Kussmaul breathing, or in general any labored breathing, including Biot's respirations and ataxic respirations). Correct usage would restrict the term to the last breaths before death.

Agonal respirations are also commonly seen in cases of cardiogenic shock or cardiac arrest, where agonal respirations may persist for several minutes after cessation of heartbeat. The presence of agonal respirations in these cases indicates a more favorable prognosis than in cases of cardiac arrest without agonal respirations. In an unresponsive, pulseless patient in cardiac arrest, agonal gasps are not effective breaths. Agonal respiration occurs in 40% of cardiac arrests experienced outside a hospital environment.

References

External links
 
 
 
 Gasping, even the dead breathe Real footage of a person with cardiac arrest and terminal breathing (gasping)

Breathing abnormalities
Medical emergencies